Smaragdia purpureomaculata is a species of sea snail, a marine gastropod mollusk in the family Neritidae.

Description
The length of the shell attains 2.8 mm.

Distribution
This marine species occurs in the Gulf of Aqaba, Egypt.

References

External links
 Dekker, H., 2000. The Neritidae (Gastropoda) from the circumarabian seas, with the description of two new species, a new subgenus and a new genus. Vita Marina 47(2): 29-64
 Blatterer H. (2019). Mollusca of the Dahab region (Gulf of Aqaba, Red Sea). Denisia. 43: 1-480

Neritidae
Gastropods described in 2000